Damansara Heights is an upscale suburb in western side of Kuala Lumpur, Malaysia, located five kilometres away from the city centre. The suburb falls under the Segambut district and its parliamentary constituency. It is a sought-after residential and commercial address in Klang Valley.

Background 
Damansara Heights is accessible from Kuala Lumpur and Petaling Jaya. Jalan Maarof, in Bangsar, connects Jalan Damansara. Jalan Duta and Jalan Semantan can be used to enter into Damansara Heights from the North-South Expressway.

The Medan Damansara neighbourhood consisting of two storey link houses were built in 1972. It started as a residential scheme for government servants more than 20 years ago. The enclave hosts colleges, large multinational corporations, restaurants, regulatory bodies, and government departments.

The first office building built in Damansara Heights was Wisma Damansara, built in 1970 by Selangor Properties. This was followed by the Damansara Office Complex on Jalan Dungun, which at the time also housed the local stock exchange, Bursa Malaysia, and the offices of Shell Malaysia.

Damansara Heights is limited by its small amount of available commercial land and redevelopment is on hold. It is indicated by the demolishing of Wisma Socfin on Jalan Semantan for the construction of UOA II Damansara, along with several other buildings nearby. There are redevelopment plans for some office buildings in the area, such as Bangunan SPPK and Wisma Damansara. Wisma Beringin is undergoing refurbishment. Wisma Damansara is now being occupied wholly by HELP University.

Landmarks

Shopping and retail 
Damansara City Mall (DC Mall)
Pavilion Damansara Heights

Dining 
There are many restaurants and bars in Damansara Heights offering western and local cuisine. These include Aliyaa, Gin Rik Sha, Huckleberry, Nam, Blonde, Meet the Porkers, Frangipaani, Playte and Krung Thep.

Facilities 
Saidina Umar Al Khattab Mosque
Plaza Damansara

Government and infrastructure 
The head office of the Department of Civil Aviation Malaysia was previously in Damansara Heights.

Education

Cempaka International School is in Damansara Heights
Perdana University
Sekolah Kebangsaan Bukit Damansara
Help University is in Damansara Heights

Transportation

Public transportation 
Damansara Heights is served by two stations on the Kajang line: the  Pusat Bandar Damansara MRT station and  Semantan MRT station.

Car 
Sprint Expressway cuts through Damansara Heights in an NE-SW direction.

See also
 Damansara
 Bukit Kiara
 Sri Hartamas

References

Suburbs in Kuala Lumpur